The 36th Assembly District of Wisconsin is one of 99 districts in the Wisconsin State Assembly. Located in northern Wisconsin, the district comprises all Florence,  Forest, and Menominee counties, as well as most of Marinette County, central Oconto County, and parts of northern Shawano County.  It includes the cities of Crandon, Gillett, Oconto Falls, and Niagara, and the villages of Cecil, Crivitz, Lena, Suring, and Wausaukee.  It also contains the Forest County Potawatomi Community, the Sokaogon Chippewa Community, the Menominee Indian Reservation, and the Stockbridge–Munsee Community, and contains most of the Nicolet National Forest, including the Headwaters Wilderness.  The district is represented by Republican Jeffrey Mursau, since January 2005.

The 36th Assembly district is located within Wisconsin's 12th Senate district, along with the 34th and 35th Assembly districts.

List of past representatives

References 

Wisconsin State Assembly districts
Forest County, Wisconsin
Langlade County, Wisconsin
Marinette County, Wisconsin
Menominee County, Wisconsin
Oconto County, Wisconsin
Shawano County, Wisconsin